This is the discography of English easy listening singer Roger Whittaker.

European albums (selected)

 1967 If I Were a Rich Man (as 'Rog Whittaker')
 1967 Dynamic!
 1968 Whistle Stop!
 1969 This Is Roger Whittaker
 1970 I Don't Believe in If Anymore
 1970 Whistling Roger Whittaker
 1971 New World in the Morning 
 1972 Roger Whittaker... Again
 1972 Loose and Fiery
 1975 Magical World of Roger Whittaker
 1975 Ride A Country Road
 1978 Roger Whittaker Sings The Hits
 1979 Mein Deutsches Album (in German)
 1981 Changes 
 1981 Zum Weinen ist immer noch Zeit
 1982 Roger Whittaker In Kenya – A Musical Safari 
 1982 Typisch Roger Whittaker
 1983 Voyager
 1984 Take A Little – Give A Little 
 1984 Ein Glück, daß es Dich gibt
 1986 The Genius Of Love 
 1987 His Finest Collection
 1987 Heut bin ich arm – Heut bin ich reich
 1988 Living And Loving 
 1989 Love Will Be Our Home 
 1990 You Deserve The Best 
 1991 Frohe Weinacht – Die schönsten Weihnachtslieder
 1991 Mein Herz schlägt nur für Dich
 1992 Stimme des Herzens
 1993 Stille Nacht, heilige Nacht
 1994 An Evening with Roger Whittaker
 1994 Leben mit Dir
 1994 Sehnsucht nach Liebe
 1994 Geschenk des Himmels
 1995 Ein schöner Tag mit Dir
 1996 Alles Roger!
 1996 Einfach leben
 1997 Zurück zur Liebe
 1999 Alles Roger 2
 1999 Awakening
 2000 Wunderbar geborgen
 2002 Mehr denn je
 2003 Alles Roger 3
 2003 Der weihnachtliche Liedermarkt
 2004 Live in Berlin
 2004 Mein schönster Traum
 2005 Moments in My Life
 2007 The Danish Collection
 2008 The Golden Age Of Roger Whittaker – 50 Years Of Classic Hits 
 2012 Wunder (German language album)

Canadian albums

 1973 Roger Whittaker En Spectacle Au Quebec – RCA
 1975 Roger Whittaker Live In Canada – Tembo

US albums

Singles

References

External links
 
 Entries at 45cat.com

Country music discographies
Discographies of British artists